Gouldstone is a surname. Notable people with the surname include:

 Harry Gouldstone (born 2001), English cricketer
 John Gouldstone (active 1785–1793), English cricketer
 Mark Gouldstone (born 1963), English cricketer

See also
 Goldstone (surname)
 Henry Goulstone
 John Goulstone Lewis
 Kerry Goulstone